Černý Most (English: Black Bridge) is a Prague Metro station and terminus of Line B, serving the Černý Most housing estate and shopping district and nearby suburbs of Prague. The station was opened on 8 November 1998 as the eastern terminus of the extension of Line B from Českomoravská.

The station is directly adjacent to an intercity bus terminal. Not only it is one of few Prague Metro subway stations that is not located underground, its vestibule is located even higher than the main stands and roads of the bus terminal.

References

Prague Metro stations
Railway stations opened in 1998
1998 establishments in the Czech Republic
Railway stations in the Czech Republic opened in the 20th century